Florian Mennigen (born 10 April 1982 in Ratzeburg) is a German former representative rower. He is a three time world champion and an Olympic gold medallist.

At the 2012 Summer Olympics in London, he was in the crew - the Deutschlandachter- that won the gold medal in the men's eight competition.

Personal
Mennigen is an alumnus of Boston University. Following his 2012 Olympic success he was awarded the Silbernes Lorbeerblatt (Silver Laurel Leaf), Germany's highest sports award, for the achievement.

References

External links 
 
 
 
 

1982 births
Living people
Olympic rowers of Germany
Rowers at the 2008 Summer Olympics
Rowers at the 2012 Summer Olympics
People from Ratzeburg
Olympic gold medalists for Germany
German male rowers
Boston University alumni
People from Duxbury, Massachusetts
Olympic medalists in rowing
Medalists at the 2012 Summer Olympics
World Rowing Championships medalists for Germany
Sportspeople from Plymouth County, Massachusetts
Sportspeople from Schleswig-Holstein
Recipients of the Silver Laurel Leaf